The 2022 SANFL Women's League season was the sixth season of the SANFL Women's League (SANFLW). The season commenced on 4 February and concluded with the Grand Final on 28 May. The competition was contested by eight clubs, all of whom are affiliated with clubs from the men's South Australian National Football League (SANFL).

Clubs

Ladder

Finals series

First semi-final

Second semi-final

Preliminary final

Grand Final

Awards
SANFL Women's Best and Fairest
 Jessica Bates – 22 votes
Coaches Award
 Jessica Bates – 86 votes
Leading Goal Kicker Award
 Alana Lishmund – 18 goals
Leadership Award
 Alison Ferrall
Development League Premiers
 No finals series or grand final was staged;  finished the highest on the ladder at the conclusion of the season.

References

SANFL Women's League
SANFLW